Robert, Robbie, or Bob Thorpe may refer to:

 Sir Robert Thorpe, Master of Pembroke Hall, 1347–1362
 Robert Thorpe (Lord Chancellor) (died 1372), British judge
 Robert Thorpe (priest) (died 1591), English Roman Catholic priest and martyr
 Robert Thorpe (judge) (c. 1764–1836), Canadian judge and political figure
 Robert Thorpe (Kashmir), (1838–1868), soldier and chronicler on Kashmir
 Bob Thorpe (outfielder) (1926–1996), Major League Baseball right fielder
 Bob Thorpe (pitcher) (1935–1960), American professional baseball pitcher
Robert (Robbie) Thorpe (fl. 1970s–), Aboriginal Australian activist and radio presenter

See also
 Robert Thorp (disambiguation)
 Bob Thorpe (disambiguation)